"Daydreaming" is the fifth single from Kid Sister's debut studio album Ultraviolet. The song features uncredited vocals from Cee Lo Green (known then as Cee-Lo).

Track listing

Charts

References

2010 singles
Kid Sister songs
2009 songs
Songs written by Brian Kennedy (record producer)
Asylum Records singles